Ashan (also Romanized as Ashan and Eshan; also known as Asheh and Ishan) is a village in Ashan Rural District, Mehrdasht District, Najafabad County, Isfahan Province, Iran. At the 2006 census, its population was 2,735, in 709 families.

References 

Populated places in Najafabad County